The Undisputed Truth is the self titled debut album of the Motown group of the same name.

Reception

Released in 1971, it was produced entirely by Norman Whitfield. The album includes the group's biggest hit single (and only US Top 40 hit), "Smiling Faces Sometimes", which peaked at #3 on the US Billboard Hot 100 Chart. Many of the songs on this album were also recorded by the group's Motown labelmates, The Temptations (also produced by Norman Whitfield). "Save My Love For A Rainy Day", for example, was originally recorded by The Temptations for their 1967 album The Temptations With A Lot O' Soul. The Undisputed Truth's version was released as their debut single, and it became a minor R&B hit, peaking at #43.

The album itself mixes the traditional Motown sound with psychedelic-influenced soul music. A prime example of this is "You Got The Love I Need", which actually uses a backing track recorded in 1965 - the same backing track used for The Temptations' song "I Got Heaven Right Here On Earth", which is an unreleased outtake from their A Lot O' Soul album. "You Got The Love I Need" was released as the B-side to The Undisputed Truth's hit single "Smiling Faces Sometimes". It is also the only original song on the album, as all its other tracks had already been recorded by other artists.

Track listing
"You Got The Love I Need" (Barrett Strong, Norman Whitfield) 2:57
"Save My Love For A Rainy Day" (Norman Whitfield, Roger Penzabene) 3:50
"California Soul" (Nickolas Ashford, Valerie Simpson) 3:45
"Aquarius" (Galt McDermot, Gerome Ragni, James Rado) 2:39
"Ball of Confusion (That's What the World is Today)" (Barrett Strong, Norman Whitfield) 10:20
"Smiling Faces Sometimes" (Barrett Strong, Norman Whitfield) 3:05
"We've Got a Way Out Love" (Holland-Dozier-Holland) 2:55
"Since I've Lost You" (Barrett Strong, Norman Whitfield) 3:10
"Ain't No Sun Since You've Been Gone" (Cornelius Grant, Norman Whitfield, Simon May) 2:42
"I Heard It Through the Grapevine" (Barrett Strong, Norman Whitfield) 2:51
"Like a Rolling Stone" (Bob Dylan) 6:30

Charts

Singles

External links 
 The Undisputed Truth at Discogs.com

References

1971 debut albums
The Undisputed Truth albums
Gordy Records albums
Albums produced by Norman Whitfield